The Roman Catholic Church in the 20th century had to respond to the challenge of increasing secularization of Western society and persecution resulting from great social unrest and revolutions in several countries. It instituted many reforms, particularly in the 1970s under the Vatican II Council, in order to modernize practices and positions. In this period, Catholic missionaries in the Far East worked to improve education and health care, while evangelizing peoples and attracting numerous followers in China, Taiwan, Korea, and Japan.

Catholic social teaching

Rerum novarum
The Industrial Revolution brought many concerns about the deteriorating working and living conditions of urban workers. Influenced by the German Bishop Wilhelm Emmanuel Freiherr von Ketteler, in 1891 Pope Leo XIII published the encyclical Rerum novarum, titled "On Capital and Labor". This encyclical set in context Catholic social teaching in terms that rejected socialism but advocated the regulation of working conditions. Rerum novarum argued for the establishment of a living wage and the right of workers to form trade unions.

In Rerum novarum, Leo set out the Catholic Church's response to the social instability and labor conflict that had arisen in the wake of industrialization and had led to the rise of socialism. The Pope taught that the role of the State is to promote social justice through the protection of rights, while the Church must speak out on social issues in order to teach correct social principles and ensure class harmony. He restated the Church's long-standing teaching regarding the crucial importance of private property rights, but recognised, in one of the best-known passages of the encyclical, that the free operation of market forces must be tempered by moral considerations:

Rerum novarum is remarkable for its vivid depiction of the plight of the late 19th-century urban poor and for its condemnation of unrestricted capitalism. Among the remedies it prescribed were the formation of trade unions and the introduction of collective bargaining, particularly as an alternative to state intervention. Rerum novarum also recognized that the poor have a special status in consideration of social issues: the modern Catholic principle of the "preferential option for the poor" and the notion that God is on the side of the poor found their first expression in this document.

Quadragesimo anno

Forty years after Rerum novarum, and more than a year into the Great Depression, Pope Pius XI issued Quadragesimo anno, subtitled "On Reconstruction of the Social Order". Released on 15 May 1931, this encyclical expanded on Rerum novarum, noting the positive effect of the earlier document but pointing out that the world had changed significantly since Pope Leo's time.

Unlike Leo, who addressed mainly the condition of workers, Pius XI concentrated on the ethical implications of the social and economic order. He called for the reconstruction of the social order based on the principle of solidarity and subsidiarity. He also noted major dangers for human freedom and dignity, arising from both unrestrained capitalism and totalitarian communism.

Pius XI reiterated Leo's defence of private property rights and collective bargaining, and repeated his contention that blind economic forces cannot create a just society on their own:

Quadragesimo Anno also supported state intervention to mediate labor-management conflicts (a reference to the economic system which Mussolini was attempting to establish in Italy at the time), and introduced the concept of subsidiarity into Catholic thought.

Prior to Quadragesimo anno, some Catholics had wondered whether Leo XIII's condemnation of radical left-wing politics in Rerum novarum extended only to outright communism or whether it included milder forms of socialism as well. Pius made it clear that non-communistic Socialism was included in the condemnation. The Catholic Church defined a distinctive position for itself between free-market capitalism on the right and statist socialism on the left.

Pius XII

The social teachings of Pope Pius XII repeat these teachings, and apply them in greater detail not only to workers and owners of capital, but also to other professions, such as politicians, educators, housewives, farmers bookkeepers, international organizations, and all aspects of life including the military. Going beyond Pius XI, he also defined social teachings in the areas of medicine, psychology, sport, TV, science, law and education. There is virtually no social issue, which Pius XII did not address and relate to the Christian faith. He was called "the Pope of Technology", for his willingness and ability to examine the social implications of technological advances. The dominant concern was the continued rights and dignity of the individual. With the beginning of the space age at the end of his pontificate, Pius XII explored the social implications of space exploration and satellites on the social fabric of humanity, asking for a new sense of community and solidarity in light of existing papal teachings on subsidiarity.

The Catholic Church exercised a prominent role in shaping America's labor movement. In 1933, two American Catholics, Dorothy Day and Peter Maurin, founded a new Catholic peace group, the Catholic Worker that would embody their ideals of pacifism, commitment to the poor, and to fundamental change in American society. They published a newspaper of the same name for years.

Anti-clericalism
In Latin America, a succession of anti-clerical regimes came to power beginning in the 1830s. In the 1920s and 1930s, the Catholic Church was subjected to unprecedented persecution in Mexico, as well as in Europe in Spain and the Soviet Union. Pope Pius XI called this the "terrible triangle".

The "harsh persecution short of total annihilation of the clergy, monks, and nuns and other people associated with the Church", began in 1918 and continued well into the 1930s. The Civil War in Spain started in 1936, during which thousands of churches were destroyed, thirteen bishops and some 6,832 clergy and religious Spaniards were assassinated.

After the widespread Church persecutions in Mexico, Spain and the Soviet Union, Pius XI defined communism as the main adversary of the Catholic Church in his encyclical Divini Redemptoris issued on 19 March 1937. He blamed Western powers and media for a "conspiracy of silence" with respect to the persecutions carried out by Communist, Socialist and Fascist forces.

Mexico
In Mexico, the Calles Law eventually led to the "worst guerilla war in Latin American History", the Cristero War. Between 1926 and 1934, over 3,000 priests were exiled or assassinated. In an effort to prove that "God would not defend the Church", Calles ordered Church desecrations in which services were mocked, nuns were raped, and captured priests were shot.

Calles was eventually deposed. Despite the persecution, the Church in Mexico continued to grow. A 2000 census reported that 88 percent of Mexicans identify as Catholic.

Spain
During the Spanish Civil War, Spanish republicans and anarchists targeted priests and nuns as symbols of conservatism, murdering large numbers of them. Confiscation of Church properties and restrictions on people's religious freedoms have generally accompanied secularist and Marxist-leaning governmental reforms.

Soviet Union
Worried by the persecution of Christians in the Soviet Union, Pius XI mandated Berlin nuncio Eugenio Pacelli to work secretly on diplomatic arrangements between the Vatican and the Soviet Union. Pacelli negotiated food shipments for Russia, and met with Soviet representatives including Foreign Minister Georgi Chicherin, who rejected any kind of religious education, or the ordination of priests and bishops, but offered agreements without the points vital to the Vatican. Despite Vatican pessimism and a lack of visible progress, Pacelli continued the secret negotiations. Pius XI ordered them to be discontinued in 1927, because they generated no results and he believed they would be dangerous to the Church's standing, if made public.

The harsh persecution continued well into the 1930s. The Soviet government executed and exiled many clerics, monks and laymen, confiscating Church implements "for victims of famine", and closing many churches. Yet according to an official report based on the census of 1936, some 55% of Soviet citizens identified themselves openly as religious, while others possibly concealed their belief.

In other countries

Eastern Europe
Following the Soviet doctrine regarding the exercise of religion, postwar Communist governments in Eastern Europe severely restricted religious freedoms. Even though some clerics collaborated with the Communist regimes during their decades of power, from the late 1980s the Church's resistance and the leadership of Pope John Paul II have been credited with hastening the downfall in 1991 of communist governments across Europe.

China
The rise to power of the Communists in China of 1949 led to the expulsion of all foreign missionaries, "often after cruel and farcical 'public trials'." In an effort to further isolate Chinese Catholics, the new government created the Patriotic Church whose unilaterally appointed bishops were initially rejected by Rome but subsequently many were accepted. The Cultural Revolution of the 1960s encouraged gangs of teenagers to eliminate all religious establishments and convert their occupants into labourers. When Chinese churches eventually reopened, they remained under the control of the Communist party's Patriotic Church, and many Catholic pastors and priests continued to be sent to prison for refusing to renounce allegiance to Rome.

Latin America
General Juan Perón's Argentina and Fidel Castro's Cuba also engaged in extensive anti-clericalism, confiscating Catholic properties.

In 1954, under the regime of General Juan Perón, Argentina saw extensive destruction of churches, denunciations of clergy and confiscation of Catholic schools as Perón attempted to extend state control over national institutions. Cuba, under atheist Fidel Castro, succeeded in reducing the Church's ability to work by deporting the archbishop and 150 Spanish priests, discriminating against Catholics in public life and education and refusing to accept them as members of the Communist Party. The subsequent flight of 300,000 people from the island also helped to diminish the Church there.

Response to authoritarianism
Authoritarianism or Fascism describes certain related political regimes in 20th-century Europe, especially the Nazi Germany of Hitler, the authoritarian Soviet Union, the Fascist Italy of Mussolini and the falangist Spain of Franco.

Pope Pius XI was moderately skeptical of Italian Fascism.

To Pope Pius XI, Dollfuss in Austria was the ideal politician realising Quadragesimo anno.

Nazi Germany

In the 1937 encyclical Mit brennender Sorge, drafted by the future Pope Pius XII, Pope Pius XI warned Catholics that antisemitism is incompatible with Christianity. Read from the pulpits of all German Catholic churches, it described Hitler as an insane and arrogant prophet and was the first official denunciation of Nazism made by any major organization. Nazi persecution of the Church in Germany then began by "outright repression" and "staged prosecutions of monks for homosexuality, with the maximum of publicity." When Dutch bishops protested against deportation of Jews in the Netherlands, the Nazi's responded with even more severe measures.

On 20 July 1933, the Vatican signed an agreement with Germany, the Reichskonkordat, partly in an effort to stop Nazi persecution of Catholic institutions.  When this escalated to include physical violence, Pope Pius XI issued the 1937 encyclical Mit brennender Sorge.  Drafted by the future Pope Pius XII and read from the pulpits of all German Catholic churches, it criticized Hitler, and condemned Nazi persecution and ideology and has been characterized by scholars as the "first great official public document to dare to confront and criticize Nazism" and "one of the greatest such condemnations ever issued by the Vatican." According to Eamon Duffy, "The impact of the encyclical was immense" and the "infuriated" Nazis increased their persecution of Catholics and the Church by initiating a "long series" of persecution of clergy and other measures. Pius XI later warned that antisemitism is incompatible with Christianity.

Despite a number of condemnations of atrocities committed during World War II, Pope Pius XII has been criticized for not having explicitly spoken out against the Holocaust. Although he never defended himself against such criticism, there is evidence that he chose to keep his public pronouncements circumspect while acting covertly to assist Jews seeking refuge from the Holocaust. Although Pius XII was exhorted by the British government and the Polish government-in-exile to condemn Nazi atrocities directly, he declined to do so out of concern that such pronouncements would only instigate further persecution by the Nazis. These sentiments were based on opinions expressed to him by bishops in Germany and Poland.  When Dutch bishops protested against the wartime deportation of Jews, the Nazis responded by increasing deportations rounding up 92 converts including Edith Stein who were then deported and murdered. "The brutality of the retaliation made an enormous impression on Pius XII." In Poland, the Nazis murdered over 2,500 monks and priests and even more were imprisoned. In the Soviet Union, an even more severe persecution occurred.

After the war, Pius XII's efforts to protect their people were recognised by prominent Jews including Albert Einstein and Rabbi Isaac Herzog. However, the Church has also been accused by some of encouraging centuries of antisemitism and Pius himself of not doing enough to stop Nazi atrocities. Prominent members of the Jewish community have contradicted these criticisms. The Israeli historian Pinchas Lapide interviewed war survivors and concluded that Pius XII "was instrumental in saving at least 700,000, but probably as many as 860,000 Jews from certain death at Nazi hands". Some historians dispute this estimate while others consider Pinchas Lapide's work to be "the definitive work by a Jewish scholar" on the holocaust. Even so, in 2000 Pope John Paul II on behalf of all people, apologized to Jews by inserting a prayer at the Western Wall that read "We're deeply saddened by the behavior of those in the course of history who have caused the children of God to suffer, and asking your forgiveness, we wish to commit ourselves to genuine brotherhood with the people of the Covenant." This papal apology, one of many issued by Pope John Paul II for past human and Church failings throughout history, was especially significant because John Paul II emphasized Church guilt for, and the Second Vatican Council's condemnation of, anti-Semitism. The papal letter We Remember: A Reflection on the Shoah, urged Catholics to repent "of past errors and infidelities" and "renew the awareness of the Hebrew roots of their faith."

In Austria, since 1938 part of Nazi Germany, in particular, the Catholic resistance against National Socialism was active very early on. Many of the Catholic resistance groups were loyal to the House of Habsburg, which drew the particular anger of the Nazi regime on them. The groups wanted on the one hand, like those around the Augustinian monk Roman Karl Scholz or Jakob Gapp, Otto Neururer, Franz Reinisch, Carl Lampert, Maria Restituta Kafka and Johann Gruber to inform the population about the Nazi crimes and, on the other hand, to take active robust action against the Nazi system. The group around the priest Heinrich Maier (CASSIA – Maier-Messner group) successfully redirected the production sites of V-1, V-2 rockets, Tiger tanks, Messerschmitt Bf 109, Messerschmitt Me 163 Komet and other aircraft to the Allies so that they could bomb more accurately and the war was over faster. Maier and his people were in contact with Allen Dulles, the head of the OSS in Switzerland since 1942. The group reported to him also about the mass murder in Auschwitz. The Gestapo exposed the resistance group and most of the members, including Maier, were severely tortured and killed. 

In Poland, the Nazis murdered over 2500 monks and priests while even more were sent to concentration camps. The Priester-Block (priests barracks) in Dachau concentration camp lists 2600 Roman Catholic priests. Stalin staged an even more severe persecution at almost the same time. After World War II historians such as David Kertzer accused the Church of encouraging centuries of anti-Semitism, and Pope Pius XII of not doing enough to stop Nazi atrocities.

Prominent members of the Jewish community, including Golda Meir, Albert Einstein, Moshe Sharett and Rabbi Isaac Herzog contradicted the criticisms and spoke highly of Pius' efforts to protect Jews, while others such as rabbi David G. Dalin noted that "hundreds of thousands" of Jews were saved by the Church.

Regarding the matter, historian Derek Holmes wrote, "There is no doubt that the Catholic districts, resisted the lure of National Socialism Nazism far better than the Protestant ones." Pope Pius XI declared – Mit brennender Sorge – that Fascist governments had hidden "pagan intentions" and expressed the irreconcilability of the Catholic position and Totalitarian Fascist State Worship, which placed the nation above God and fundamental human rights and dignity.  His declaration that "Spiritually, [Christians] are all Semites" prompted the Nazis to give him the title "Chief Rabbi of the Christian World".

Catholic priests were executed in concentration camps alongside Jews; for example, 2,600 Catholic Priests were imprisoned in Dachau, and 2,000 of them were executed.  A further 2,700 Polish priests were executed (a quarter of all Polish priests), and 5,350 Polish nuns were either displaced, imprisoned, or executed. Many Catholic laypeople and clergy played notable roles in sheltering Jews during the Holocaust, including Pope Pius XII (1876–1958).  The head rabbi of Rome became a Catholic in 1945 and, in honour of the actions the Pope undertook to save Jewish lives, he took the name Eugenio (the pope's first name). A former Israeli consul in Italy claimed: "The Catholic Church saved more Jewish lives during the war than all the other churches, religious institutions, and rescue organisations put together."

Independent State of Croatia

In dismembered Yugoslavia, the Church favored the Nazi-installed Croatian Roman Catholic fascist Ustaše regime due to its anti-communist ideology and for the potential to reinstate Catholic influence in the region following the dissolution of Austria-Hungary. Pius XII was a long-standing supporter of Croat nationalism; he hosted a national pilgrimage to Rome in November 1939 for the cause of the canonization of Nikola Tavelić, and largely "confirmed the Ustashe perception of history" writes John Cornwell. The Church however did not formally recognize the Independent State of Croatia (NDH).

Despite being informed of the regime's genocide against Orthodox Serbs, Jews and other non-Croats, the Church did not publicly speak out against it, preferring to exert pressure through diplomacy. In assessing the Vatican's position, historian Jozo Tomasevich writes that "it seems the Catholic Church fully supported the [Ustaše] regime and its policies."

After the war, many Ustaše fled the country with the help of Father Krunoslav Draganović, secretary of the Pontifical Croatian College of St. Jerome in Rome. Pius XII protected dictator Ante Pavelić after World War II, gave him "refuge in the Vatican properties in Rome", and assisted in his flight to South America; Pavelić and Pius XII shared the goal of a Catholic state in the Balkans and were unified in their opposition to the rising Communist state under Tito.

Latin America

South America, historically Catholic, has experienced a large Evangelical and Pentecostal infusion in the 20th century due to the influx of Christian missionaries from abroad.  For example: Brazil, South America's largest country, is the largest Catholic country in the world, and at the same time is the largest Evangelical country in the world (based on population).  Some of the largest Christian congregations in the world are found in Brazil.

China
In 1939, Pope Pius XII, within weeks of his coronation, reverted the 250-year-old Vatican policy and permitted Catholics to practice Confucianism. The Church began to flourish again with twenty new arch-dioceses, seventy-nine dioceses and thirty-eight apostolic prefects, but only until 1949, when the Communist revolution took over the country.

Second Vatican Council

A major event of the Second Vatican Council, known as Vatican II, was the issuance by Pope Paul VI and Orthodox Patriarch Athenagoras of a joint expression of regret for many of the past actions that had led up to the Great Schism between the Western and Eastern churches, expressed as the Catholic-Orthodox Joint declaration of 1965. At the same time, they lifted the mutual excommunications dating from the 11th century.

The Catholic Church engaged in a comprehensive process of reform following the Second Vatican Council (1962–65). Intended as a continuation of Vatican I, under Pope John XXIII the council developed into an engine of modernisation. It was tasked with making the historical teachings of the Church clear to a modern world, and made pronouncements on topics including the nature of the church, the mission of the laity and religious freedom. The council approved a revision of the liturgy and permitted the Latin liturgical rites to use vernacular languages as well as Latin during mass and other sacraments. Efforts by the Church to improve Christian unity became a priority. In addition to finding common ground on certain issues with Protestant churches, the Catholic Church has discussed the possibility of unity with the Eastern Orthodox Church.

On 11 October 1962 Pope John XXIII opened the Second Vatican Council, the 21st ecumenical council of the Catholic Church. The council was "pastoral" in nature, emphasising and clarifying already defined dogma, revising liturgical practices, and providing guidance for articulating traditional Church teachings in contemporary times. The council is perhaps best known for its instructions that the Mass may be celebrated in the vernacular as well as in Latin.

At the Second Vatican Council (1962–1965) the debate on papal primacy and authority re-emerged, and in the Dogmatic Constitution on the Church Lumen gentium, the Roman Catholic Church's teaching on the authority of the Pope, bishops and councils was further elaborated.  Vatican II sought to correct the unbalanced ecclesiology left behind by Vatican I. The result is the body of teaching about the papacy and episcopacy contained in the Dogmatic Constitution on the Church, Lumen gentium.

Vatican II reaffirmed everything Vatican I taught about papal primacy and infallibility, but it added important points about bishops. Bishops, it says, are not "vicars of the Roman Pontiff". Rather, in governing their local churches they are "vicars and legates of Christ". Together, they form a body, a "college", whose head is the pope. This episcopal college is responsible for the well-being of the Universal Church. Here in a nutshell are the basic elements of the council's much-discussed communio ecclesiology, which affirms the importance of local churches and the doctrine of collegiality.

In a key passage about collegiality, Vatican II teaches: "The order of bishops is the successor to the college of the apostles in their role as teachers and pastors, and in it the apostolic college is perpetuated. Together with their head, the Supreme Pontiff, and never apart from him, they have supreme and full authority over the Universal Church; but this power cannot be exercised without the agreement of the Roman Pontiff". Much of the present discussion of papal primacy is concerned with exploring the implications of this passage.

Chapter 3 of the dogmatic constitution on the Church of Vatican Council I (Pastor aeternus) is the principal document of the Magisterium about the content and nature of the primatial power of the Roman Pontiff. Chapter 4 is a development and defining of one particular characteristic of this primatial power, namely the Pope's supreme teaching authority, i.e. when the Pope speaks ex cathedra he teaches the doctrine of the faith infallibly.

Reforms
Changes to old rites and ceremonies following Vatican II produced a variety of responses. Some stopped going to church, while others tried to preserve the old liturgy with the help of sympathetic priests. These formed the basis of today's Traditionalist Catholic groups, which believe that the reforms of Vatican II have gone too far. Liberal Catholics form another dissenting group who feel that the Vatican II reforms did not go far enough. The liberal views of theologians such as Hans Küng and Charles Curran, led to Church withdrawal of their authorization to teach as Catholics. According to Professor Thomas Bokenkotter, most Catholics "accepted the changes more or less gracefully". In 2007, Benedict XVI reinstated the old mass as an option, to be celebrated upon request by the faithful.

A new Codex Juris Canonici – Canon Law called for by John XXIII, was promulgated by Pope John Paul II on 25 January 1983. It includes numerous reforms and alterations in Church law and Church discipline for the Latin Church. It replaced the 1917 version issued by Benedict XV.

The Catholic Church initiated a comprehensive process of reform under Pope John XXIII. Intended as a continuation of the First Vatican Council, the Second Vatican Council (1962–1965), developed into an engine of modernisation, making pronouncements on religious freedom, the nature of the Church and the mission of the laity. The role of the bishops of the Church was brought into renewed prominence, especially when seen collectively, as a college that has succeeded to that of the Apostles in teaching and governing the Church. This college does not exist without its head, the successor of St. Peter.  It also permitted the Latin liturgical rites to use vernacular languages as well as Latin during Mass and other sacraments. Christian unity became a greater priority. In addition to finding more common ground with Protestant Churches, the Catholic Church has reopened discussions regarding the possibility of unity with the Eastern Orthodox churches.

Modernism and Liberation theology

In the 1960s, growing social awareness and politicization in the Church in Latin America gave birth to liberation theology. The Peruvian priest, Gustavo Gutiérrez, became a primary theorist and, in 1979, the bishops' conference in Mexico officially declared the Latin American Church's "preferential option for the poor". Archbishop Óscar Romero, a supporter of the movement, became the region's most famous contemporary martyr in 1980, when he was murdered by forces allied with the government of El Salvador while saying Mass. Both Pope John Paul II and Pope Benedict XVI (as Cardinal Ratzinger) denounced the movement. The Brazilian theologian-priest Leonardo Boff was twice ordered to cease publishing and teaching. Pope John Paul II was criticized for his severity in dealing with proponents of the movement, but he maintained that the Church, in its efforts to champion the poor, should not do so by advocating violence or engaging in partisan politics. The movement is still alive in Latin America today, although the Church now faces the challenge of Pentecostal revival in much of the region.

Sexuality and gender issues

The sexual revolution of the 1960s brought challenging issues for the Church. Pope Paul VI's 1968 encyclical Humanae vitae reaffirmed the Catholic Church's traditional view of marriage and marital relations and asserted a continued proscription of artificial birth control.  In addition, the encyclical reaffirmed the sanctity of life from conception to natural death and asserted a continued condemnation of both abortion and euthanasia as grave sins which were equivalent to murder.

Ordination of women

Efforts to lead the Church to consider the ordination of women led Pope John Paul II to issue two documents to explain Church teaching. Mulieris dignitatem was issued in 1988 to clarify women's equally important and complementary role in the work of the Church. Then in 1994, Ordinatio Sacerdotalis explained that the Church extends ordination only to men in order to follow the example of Jesus, who chose only men for this specific duty.

Humanae vitae
The sexual revolution of the 1960s precipitated Pope Paul VI's 1968 encyclical Humanae vitae (On Human Life), which rejected the use of contraception, including sterilization, claiming these work against the intimate relationship and moral order of husband and wife by directly opposing God's will. It approved Natural Family Planning as a legitimate means to limit family size. Abortion was condemned by the Church as early as the 1st century, again in the 14th century and again in 1995 with Pope John Paul II's encyclical Evangelium vitae (Gospel of Life). This encyclical condemned the "culture of death" which the pope often used to describe the societal embrace of contraception, abortion, euthanasia, suicide, capital punishment, and genocide. The Church's rejection of the use of condoms has provoked criticism, especially with respect to countries where the incidence of AIDS and HIV has reached epidemic proportions. The Church maintains that in countries like Kenya and Uganda, where behavioral changes are encouraged alongside condom use, greater progress in controlling the disease has been made than in those countries solely promoting condoms. Feminists disagreed with these and other Church teachings and worked together with a coalition of American nuns to lead the Church to consider the ordination of women. They stated that many of the major Church documents were supposedly full of anti-female prejudice and a number of studies were conducted to discover how this supposed prejudice developed when it was deemed contrary to the openness of Jesus. These events led Pope John Paul II to issue the 1988 encyclical Mulieris dignitatem (On the Dignity of Women), which declared that women had a different, yet equally important role in the Church. In 1994 the encyclical Ordinatio sacerdotalis (On Ordination to the Priesthood) further explained that the Church follows the example of Jesus, who chose only men for the specific priestly duty.

Modern response to Protestantism
Well into the 20th century, Catholics—even if no longer resorting to persecution—still defined Protestants as heretics. Thus, Hilaire Belloc – in his time one of the most conspicuous speakers for Catholicism in Britain – was outspoken about the "Protestant heresy". He also defined Islam as "A Christian heresy", on the grounds that Muslims accept many of the tenets of Christianity but deny the godhood of Jesus (see Hilaire Belloc#On Islam).

In the second half of the century – and especially in the wake of Vatican II – the Catholic Church, in the spirit of ecumenism, no longer referred to Protestantism as a heresy, even if the teachings of Protestantism are heretical from a Catholic perspective. Modern usage favors referring to Protestants as "separated brethren" rather than "heretics". The latter term is occasionally applied to Catholics who abandon their Church to join a Protestant denomination. Many Catholics consider most Protestants to be material rather than formal heretics, and thus non-culpable.

Among the doctrines of Protestantism that the Catholic Church considers heretical are the beliefs that: the Bible is the only source and rule of faith ("sola scriptura"), faith alone can lead to salvation ("sola fide"), and no sacramental, ministerial priesthood is attained by ordination, but there is a universal priesthood of all believers.

Catholic-Orthodox dialogue

Ecumenism broadly refers to movements between Christian groups to establish a degree of unity through dialogue. Ecumenism is derived from Greek  (oikoumene), which means "the inhabited world", but more figuratively something like "universal oneness". The movement can be distinguished into Catholic and Protestant movements, with the latter characterised by a redefined ecclesiology of "denominationalism" (which the Catholic Church, among others, rejects).

Over the last century, a number of moves have been made to reconcile the schism between the Catholic Church and the Eastern Orthodox churches.  Although progress has been made, concerns over papal primacy and the independence of the smaller Orthodox churches has blocked a final resolution of the schism.

Some of the most difficult questions in relations with the ancient Eastern Churches concern some doctrine (i.e. Filioque, Scholasticism, functional purposes of asceticism, the essence of God, Hesychasm, Fourth Crusade, establishment of the Latin Empire, Uniatism to note but a few) as well as practical matters, such as the concrete exercise of the claim to papal primacy and how to ensure that ecclesiastical union would not result in absorption of the smaller Churches by the Latin component of the much larger Catholic Church (the most numerous single religious denomination in the world). Both parties wanted to avoid the stifling or abandonment of the other churches' rich theological, liturgical and cultural heritage.

With respect to Catholic relations with Protestant communities, certain commissions were established to foster dialogue, and documents have been published that address points of doctrinal unity, such as the Joint Declaration on the Doctrine of Justification produced with the Lutheran World Federation in 1999.

Joint Theological Commission
The Joint International Commission for Theological Dialogue Between the Catholic Church and the Orthodox Church first met in Rhodes in 1980.

Other moves toward reconciliation
In June 1995, Patriarch Bartholomew I, who was elected as the 273rd Ecumenical Patriarch of Constantinople in October 1991, visited the Vatican for the first time, when he joined in the historic inter-religious day of prayer for peace at Assisi. Pope John Paul II and the Patriarch explicitly stated their mutual "desire to relegate the excommunications of the past to oblivion and to set out on the way to re-establishing full communion."

In May 1999, John Paul II traveled to Romania: the first pope since the Great Schism to visit an Eastern Orthodox country. Upon greeting John Paul II, the Romanian Patriarch Teoctist stated: "The second millennium of Christian history began with a painful wounding of the unity of the Church; the end of this millennium has seen a real commitment to restoring Christian unity." Pope John Paul II visited other strongly Orthodox areas such as Ukraine, despite lack of welcome at times. He said that healing the divisions between Western and Eastern Christianity was one of his fondest wishes.

See also

Christianity in the 20th century
History of the Roman Catholic Church#World War II
History of Christian theology#Modern Christian theology
Role of the Roman Catholic Church in civilization
Timeline of Christianity#19th century
Timeline of Christian missions#1900 to 1949
Timeline of the Roman Catholic Church#20th century
Chronological list of saints and blesseds in the 20th century

References

Further reading 

Farrell, Joseph P. God, History, & Dialectic: The Theological Foundations of the Two Europes and Their Cultural Consequences. Bound edition 1997. Electronic edition 2008.
 
 
 
Nichols, Aidan. Rome and the Eastern Churches: a Study in Schism. 1992

External links
History of Christianity Reading Room: Extensive online resources for the study of global church history (Tyndale Seminary).
Dictionary of the History of Ideas: Christianity in History

Historical Christianity, A time line with references to the descendants of the early church.

20